Jim Hendricks was an American actor and former disc jockey best known for his role as movie host Commander USA on USA Network's Commander USA's Groovie Movies that ran from 1985 to 1989.

Hendricks also acted in theater and on television in such series as Law & Order: Special Victims Unit.

Hendricks' starred in Michael Imperioli's 2009 film The Hungry Ghosts.

Hendricks died on March 17, 2018.

References

External links

1946 births
2018 deaths
American male television actors
American male stage actors
American television personalities
Male television personalities
American male film actors